Machrie Mhor is a villa on Victoria Road in Lenzie, East Dunbartonshire, Scotland.  Built around 1920, the villa was once home to the Scottish tenor Kenneth McKellar (1927–2010).

The villa is built in the "Queen Anne Revival-style." The exterior is harled, with ashlar quoins and dressings. The double-fronted south facade has a Doric portico. It has been a category C listed building since 17 August 1977.

References

External links
 Photo of Machrie Mohr nameplate and gates on flickr

Category C listed buildings in East Dunbartonshire
Listed houses in Scotland
Lenzie